Gurun or Gowrun may refer to:
 Gurun, Iran, a village in Chaharmahal and Bakhtiari Province, Iran
 Gowrun, Kerman, a village in Kerman Province, Iran
 Gurun, Kedah, a town in Malaysia
 Gurun, a fictional planet from the Slovak TV series Spadla z oblakov
 Gurun, a character in the lay "Le Fresne", by Marie de France
 Gurun (state constituency)

See also
 Gürün